Sinamangal (also Kathmandu Metropolitan City Ward 09) is a residential area of Kathmandu, the capital city of Nepal, on the banks of Bagmati River. It borders Baneshwor and Gaucharan. Tribhuvan International Airport located in Sinamangal divides Eastern side Purano Sinamangal, Pepsicola from Western side  Sinamangal both belonging to Kathmandu Metropolitan City. One of the residential area of Kathmandu, Pepsicola Town planning is located in Purano Sinamangal.

Transportation
Busses of Sajha Yatayat And Digo Yatayat Services serve Sinamangal.

References

Populated places in Kathmandu District
Neighbourhoods in Kathmandu